is a 1959 Japanese drama film directed by Kon Ichikawa. It was entered into the 1960 Cannes Film Festival, where it won the Jury Prize. It was based on the novel The Key, by Japanese novelist Junichirō Tanizaki.

Plot
A man who suspects his wife is having an affair with his daughter's fiancé places the two in dangerous situations in order to satisfy his voyeuristic curiosity.

Cast
 Machiko Kyō as Ikuko Kenmochi
 Nakamura Ganjirō II as Kenji Kenmochi
 Junko Kano as Toshiko Kenmochi
 Tatsuya Nakadai as Kimura
 Jun Hamamura as Dr. Sōma
 Tanie Kitabayashi as Hana
 Mayumi Kurata as Koike
 Kyū Sazanka as Curio dealer
 Ichirō Sugai as Masseur
 Mantarō Ushio as Dr. Kodama

See also
 The Key (1983)

References

External links

1959 films
1959 drama films
Japanese erotic drama films
1950s Japanese-language films
Japanese sex comedy films
Films based on Japanese novels
Films based on works by Jun'ichirō Tanizaki
Films directed by Kon Ichikawa
Daiei Film films
Films with screenplays by Natto Wada
Films with screenplays by Kon Ichikawa
Films produced by Masaichi Nagata
Films scored by Yasushi Akutagawa
1950s Japanese films